"Dynamite" is a song by Jamaican rapper and singer Sean Paul featuring Australian singer-songwriter Sia. It was released by Island Records as the fourth single from Paul's eighth studio album Scorcha on 22 October 2021.

Background and release 
"Dynamite" marks the second collaboration between Sean Paul and Sia. In 2016, Sia released a version of her single "Cheap Thrills" featuring Paul. It later reached number one on the Billboard Hot 100 and spent four weeks there. After this, Paul says he and Sia knew they would record another single to act as its follow-up. When Paul sent Sia a working version of "Dynamite", she told him that he "he had another hit on his hands".

Sean Paul announced the release of "Dynamite" via his social media accounts on 16 October 2021 and it was released shortly after on 22 October.

Composition 
"Dynamite" is an upbeat pop and dancehall song. The Independent described it as a "feel-good dancefloor-filler". It was produced by Canadian duo Banx & Ranx, Greg Kurstin, and Jason Jigzagula Henriques. Banx & Ranx and Kurstin were involved in songwriting too, alongside Paul, Sia, and Nyann "News" Lodge.

Track listing 
Digital download and streaming

 "Dynamite" (featuring Sia) – 3:32 

Digital download and streaming – remixes

 "Dynamite" (featuring Sia and Miss Lafamilia) [Banx & Ranx Remix] – 2:21
 "Dynamite" (featuring Sia) [Nelsaan Remix] – 3:22
 "Dynamite" (featuring Sia) – 3:32

Personnel 
Credits adapted from Tidal.

 Sean Paul – songwriting, vocals
 Sia – songwriting, vocals
 Greg Kurstin – songwriting, production, programming, additional production, additional engineering, vocal engineering
 Jason Jigzagula Henriques – production, executive production
 Banx & Ranx – production
 Yannick Rastogi – songwriting, drums, bass guitar, keyboards, programming
 Zacharie Raymond – songwriting, drums, bass guitar, keyboards, programming
 Nyann "News" Lodge – songwriting, recording engineering
 Julian Burg – additional engineering
 Josh Gudwin – mixing 
 Heidi Wang – mixing assistant
 Chris Athens – mastering

Charts

Certifications

Release history

References 

Sean Paul songs
Sia (musician) songs
2021 songs
2021 singles
Island Records singles
Songs written by Sia (musician)
Songs written by Sean Paul
Songs written by Greg Kurstin
Song recordings produced by Greg Kurstin